Kiaer or Kiær may refer to:
 Anders Nicolai Kiær (1838-1919), a Norwegian statistician
 Benedikte Kiær (born 1969), a Danish politician
 Dakky Kiær (1892–1980), a Norwegian politician
 Elias C. Kiær (1827–1911), a Norwegian businessperson
 Hans Kiær (1795–1867), a Norwegian politician

 Ian Kiaer (born 1971), an artist based in London
 Johan Aschehoug Kiær (1869–1931), a Norwegian paleontologist and geologist
 Nicolai Kiær (1888–1934), a Norwegian gymnast
 Rolf Kiær (1897–1975), a Norwegian hydrographer
 Thorry Kiær (1888–1968), a Norwegian industrialist